Michael McAuliffe may refer to:

 Michael A. McAuliffe, U.S. Air Force general
 Michael P. McAuliffe (born 1963), member of the Illinois House of Representatives
 Michael Francis McAuliffe (born 1943), American prelate of the Roman Catholic Church
 Michael McAuliffe (drug trafficker) (died 1993), Australian executed in Malaysia for drug trafficking
  Michael  McAuliffe, voice actor for Slippy Toad in Star Fox: Assault